IMCC may refer to:

 International Minerals and Chemical Corporation - Former mining and production company
 Intrahepatic Mass-forming Cholangiocarcinoma - The most common pathological classification subtype of Intrahepatic Cholangiocarcinoma
 Iowa Medical and Classification Center -  A medium security correctional facility located in Iowa